Joyce Kavuma, is a Ugandan lawyer and judge on the High Court of Uganda. She was appointed to that court by president Yoweri Museveni, on 8 February 2018.

Background and education
Joyce Kavuma was born on 18 October 1974. After attending local schools for her elementary education, she was admitted to Mount Saint Mary's College Namagunga, where she pursued both her O-Level and A-Level education.

She graduated from the Faculty of Law of Makerere University, Uganda's largest and oldest public university, with a Bachelor of Laws, in 1997. The following year, she was awarded a Diploma in Legal Practice by the Law Development Centre, in Kampala, Uganda's capital city. She holds a Master of Laws degree, specializing in International Business, awarded by Uganda Christian University, in Mukono. She also holds a Master's degree in Management, obtained from the Uganda Management Institute, in Kampala.

Career
Kavuma started her career in 1999, as a legal officer at the Legal Aid Clinic at the Law Development Center. The following year, she was appointed as Magistrate Grade One, and was assigned to the Buganda Road Court, in Kampala.

She was moved around the country, serving in Mubende, and Mukono. In 2005, she was appointed as a personal assistant to 
the late Laeticia Mukasa Kikonyogo (1940 - 2017), at that time the Deputy Chief Justice of Uganda, serving in that capacity until 2008.

In 2008, she was promoted to the position of chief magistrate and was transferred to the Makindye Chief Magistrates Court, serving there until 2011. From there, she worked at the Entebbe Chief Magistrates Court between 2012 and 2014.

She was appointed as Acting Assistant Registrar, at the Uganda Court of Appeal in 2015 and was concurrently deployed to the Nakawa Chief Magistrates Court. In 2016 she was appointed acting assistant registrar Mediation, in the Commercial Division of the High Court.

In February 2018, Justice Joyce Kavuma was appointed to the High Court of Uganda, one of 10 judges appointed to that court that day. As of March 2018, she was assigned to the Mbarara Circuit of the High Court.

See also
Monica Mugenyi
Olive Kazaarwe Mukwaya
Ministry of Justice and Constitutional Affairs (Uganda)

References

External links
Focusing On Museveni's 14 Judges, What Is Good & Bad About Them As of 9 February 2018.

21st-century Ugandan judges
1974 births
Living people
Ugandan women judges
Makerere University alumni
Law Development Centre alumni
Uganda Christian University alumni
Uganda Management Institute alumni
People from Central Region, Uganda
Justices of the High Court of Uganda
21st-century women judges